is a Japanese professional baseball pitcher for the Chiba Lotte Marines in Japan's Nippon Professional Baseball. He played from 2013 to 2017.

External links

NBP

1988 births
Living people
Japanese baseball players
Chiba Lotte Marines players